"Save the World" is a song by Swedish house music supergroup Swedish House Mafia. The song features uncredited vocals from Swedish singer John Martin, who co-wrote the song with Axwell, Steve Angello, Sebastian Ingrosso, Michel Zitron and Vincent Pontare. It was released on 13 May 2011 as a digital download, and it premiered on BBC Radio 1 on 22 April 2011 by Pete Tong.  The song debuted in the UK single chart at No. 11, and reached No. 10. Jon Watts directed the video, which features dogs as superheroes. The song peaked at number one on the Hot Dance Club Songs in the United States, becoming the group's second consecutive number-one single following "Miami 2 Ibiza" (2010). On 30 November 2011 the song received a nomination in 54th Grammy Awards for Best Dance Recording. The song has sold over 463,000 copies in the US.  Save the World was well-received from music critics. The song is written in the key of C major.

Track listing
Digital download
"Save the World" (Radio Edit) – 3:34
"Save the World" (Extended Mix) – 6:52

Digital download — remixes
"Save the World" (Knife Party Remix) – 5:13
"Save the World" (Style of Eye & Carli Remix) – 6:41
"Save the World" (Alesso Remix) – 5:41
"Save the World" (Third Party Remix) – 6:55
"Save the World" (Futurebound & Metrik Remix) – 4:23

Digital download — AN21 & Max Vangeli Remix
"Save the World" (AN21 & Max Vangeli Remix) – 6:42

Digital download — Zedd Remix
"Save the World" (Zedd Remix) – 6:21

Digital download — Cazzette Remix
"Save the World" (Cazzette's Angry Swedish Hunter Mix) – 6:22 - This remix, which was released through Swedish House Mafia's Facebook page, is no longer available for download.

Charts and certifications

Weekly charts

Year-end charts

Certifications

Release history

See also
 List of number-one dance singles of 2011 (U.S.)

References

2011 singles
Swedish House Mafia songs
Songs written by Vincent Pontare
Songs written by Sebastian Ingrosso
Songs written by Axwell
Songs written by Steve Angello
Songs written by John Martin (singer)
Songs written by Michel Zitron
2011 songs
EMI Music Sweden singles